National Highway 503, commonly referred to as NH 503, is a highway connecting the city of Dharamshala to Mubarakpur in Himachal Pradesh. NH503 has been extended from Mubarakpur to Kiratpur in Punjab. The route of NH503 is extended from Mataur Kangra to Mcleodganj Dharamshala.

Route

Junctions  

  Terminal near Kiratpur.
  near Una.
  near Mubarakpur.
  near Ranital.
  near Mataur.

See also 
 List of National Highways in India
 List of National Highways in India by state

References

External links 
 NH 503 on OpenStreetMap

National highways in India
National Highways in Himachal Pradesh
National Highways in Punjab, India
Transport in Dharamshala